The 2019 Asian Women's Club League Handball Championship was the 4th edition of the Asian Women's Club League Handball Championship held from 16 to 22 June 2019 at Almaty, Kazakhstan under the aegis of Asian Handball Federation. It was third time in history that championship was organised in Kazakhstan by the Kazakhstan Handball Federation. It also acts as the qualification tournament for the 2019 IHF Women's Super Globe with one quota place.

Participating clubs
Four clubs from three countries participated in the championship.

1 Bold indicates champion for that year.

Results
All times are local (UTC+6).

References

External links
Results (Archived)

 International handball competitions hosted by Kazakhstan
 Handball competitions in Asia
Asia
 Asian Handball Championships
 2019 in Kazakhstani sport
Asian Women's Club League Handball Championship
 June 2019 sports events in Kazakhstan
Asian Women's Club League Handball Championship
 Handball in Kazakhstan